The 320 mm naval gun was the main battery gun used to modernize Italy's World War I battleships for service during World War II. The guns were manufactured by boring out and relining the battleships' original 12"/46 (30 cm) built-up guns and modifying the turrets to increase elevation above the original 20°  maximum. Each ship carried two 548-tonne twin turrets and two 745-tonne triple turrets. All guns used pneumatically operated side-swing Welin breech blocks. Each barrel could fire two rounds per minute.

In service these guns chronically suffered of great horizontal dispersion, both from the worsened thermodynamic performance of the guns themselves and from the unequal quality of the shells fired.

M1934 guns
The s  and  originally mounted 13 guns as built in 1915 and 1914. These ships were rebuilt between 1933 and 1937 by removing the Q triple turret amidships and replacing guns in triple A turret, twin B and X turrets, and triple Y turret. Conte di Cavour carried Vickers Mk G guns while Giulio Cesare carried Pattern T guns built by Elswick Ordnance Company. Odero Terni Orlando (OTO) re-bored the Vickers guns while the Elswick guns were re-bored by Gio. Ansaldo & C. Maximum gun elevation was increased to 27°.

M1936 guns
The s  and  originally mounted 13 guns as built in 1916 and 1915. These ships were similarly rebuilt between 1937 and 1940 by removing Q turret and replacing guns in A, B, X, and Y turrets. Pattern T guns aboard Duilio were similarly rebuilt by Ansaldo while Mk G guns aboard Andrea Doria were rebuilt by OTO. Maximum gun elevation was increased to 30°.

Ammunition
The gun was loaded with four cloth bags each containing  of smokeless powder. High explosive (HE) shells weighed only . Anticipated useful barrel life was 150 effective full charges (EFC).

References
Notes

 Bibliography

External links

 NavWeaps - 320mm/44 Model 1934

Naval guns of Italy
World War II weapons of Italy
World War II artillery of Italy
320 mm artillery
World War II naval weapons
Gio. Ansaldo & C. artillery